North End Historic District can refer to:
 North End Historic District (Colorado Springs, Colorado), listed on the NRHP in Colorado
 North End Historic District (Westerly, Rhode Island), listed on the NRHP in Rhode Island
 North End Historic District (Woonsocket, Rhode Island), listed on the NRHP in Rhode Island
 North End Historic District (Newport News, Virginia), listed on the NRHP in Virginia